Pilot One is a Canadian television variety series, which aired in 1989 on CBC Television. A late-night series aimed at teenagers, the series mixed music, interviews, informational segments, commentary and comedy sketches.

Created by David Marsden after his departure from CFNY-FM, the series was originally planned to air five nights a week but was scaled back to a weekly series in advance of its premiere. It was taped in a studio converted from warehouse space on the former Expo 86 site.

The show's hosts were Lossen Chambers, Karen Campbell, Stephen Coulson, Jacques Lalonde, Paula Rempel and Martin Cummins. Contributors to the program included punk musician Chris Houston as a writer, and sex educator Sue Johansen as host of a sex and relationship advice segment. The show's cancellation was announced on April 7, 1989 due to budgetary pressures at the CBC. Despite the cancellation, the series was later sold to BBC Two in the United Kingdom, where it provided popular exposure to musical guests such as The Pursuit of Happiness and Sarah McLachlan.

The series garnered a Gemini Award nomination for Best Variety Program or Series at the 4th Gemini Awards in 1989.

References

1989 Canadian television series debuts
1989 Canadian television series endings
1980s Canadian variety television series
1980s Canadian sketch comedy television series
Television shows filmed in Vancouver
CBC Television original programming
Canadian late-night television programming